Bousquet Island,  long, lies immediately east of Herring Island in the Windmill Islands. It was first mapped from air photos taken by USN Operation Highjump in 1946 and 1947. Named by C. R. Eklund, station scientific leader, for Utilities Man 2nd Class Edward A. Bousquet, USN, a Navy Support force member of the 1957 wintering party at Wilkes Station during the International Geophysical Year (IGY).

Sometimes also known as Little Herring Island, the site is well known to Casey expeditioners for its population of breeding Weddell Seals which pup on the sea ice in theimmediate vicinity of the island.

See also 
 Composite Antarctic Gazetteer
 List of Antarctic and sub-Antarctic islands
 List of Antarctic islands south of 60° S 
 SCAR
 Territorial claims in Antarctica

References

External links 

Windmill Islands